Nathan S. Lewis is the George L. Argyros Professor of Chemistry at the California Institute of Technology (Caltech). He specializes in functionalization of silicon and other semiconductor surfaces, chemical sensing using chemiresistive sensor arrays, and alternative energy and artificial photosynthesis.

Early life and education
Lewis obtained his B.S. and M.S. degrees at Caltech under Harry B. Gray in 1977 studying the redox reactions of inorganic rhodium complexes. After that, he moved to the Massachusetts Institute of Technology for his Ph.D. in 1981 under Mark S. Wrighton studying semiconductor electrochemistry.

Career

Lewis went to Stanford as an assistant professor from 1981 to 1985 and then as a tenured Associate Professor from 1986 to 1988, before returning to Caltech in 1988.  He became a full professor at Caltech in 1991. In 1992, he became the Principal Investigator of the Molecular Materials Resource Center at the Beckman Institute at Caltech.

His research interests include surface chemistry, particularly silicon surfaces and their photoelectrochemical performance. The study of electron transfer reactions, both at surfaces and in transition metal complexes, in response to light, has relevance for the creation of semiconductors and for artificial photosynthesis. A major focus of his research is solar energy. He is working on the development of components for a  photoanode, photocathode, and  ion-conducting membrane for a system for artificial photosynthesis that would use  sunlight and water to produce hydrogen and oxygen. He is also engaged in "big-picture" thinking about the science and policy issues affecting solar conversion.

In addition, Lewis is involved in the creation and use of novel organic polymers and the creation of sensor arrays and pattern recognition algorithms for an "electronic nose" that can be used for detection of explosives and diagnosis of illness. The American Ceramic Society awarded him the 2003 Edward Orton, Jr. Memorial Lecture award for "An ‘Electronic Nose’ Based on Arrays of Conducting Polymer Composite Vapor Detectors".

In July, 2010 Lewis was named as director of a U.S. Department of Energy Energy Innovation Hub, the Joint Center for Artificial Photosynthesis, to develop revolutionary methods to generate fuels directly from sunlight. He has been appointed chair of the Editorial Board for Energy and Environmental Science. He was #17 in the 2009 Rolling Stone list of Agents of Change.

Awards
 1977, Hertz Fellowship
 1985, Sloan Research Fellowship
 1985, Camille Dreyfus Teacher-Scholar Awards
 1988, Presidential Young Investigator Award
 1990, Fresenius Award
 1991, ACS Award in Pure Chemistry
 2003, Edward Orton, Jr. Memorial Lecture award
 2003, Princeton Environmental Award
 2008, Michael Faraday Medal of the Royal Society of Electrochemistry
 2017, National Academy of Inventors Fellow

References

External links 
 Presentations regarding challenges involved with widespread adoption of renewable energy technologies

Living people
California Institute of Technology faculty
Year of birth missing (living people)
21st-century American chemists
Massachusetts Institute of Technology School of Science alumni
California Institute of Technology alumni